The arrondissement of Ajaccio is an arrondissement (district) in the department of Corse-du-Sud in the territorial collectivity of Corsica. It has 81 communes.

Composition

The communes of the arrondissement of Ajaccio, and their INSEE codes, are:

 Afa (2A001)
 Ajaccio (2A004)
 Alata (2A006)
 Albitreccia (2A008)
 Ambiegna (2A014)
 Appietto (2A017)
 Arbori (2A019)
 Arro (2A022)
 Azilone-Ampaza (2A026)
 Azzana (2A027)
 Balogna (2A028)
 Bastelica (2A031)
 Bastelicaccia (2A032)
 Bocognano (2A040)
 Calcatoggio (2A048)
 Campo (2A056)
 Cannelle (2A060)
 Carbuccia (2A062)
 Cardo-Torgia (2A064)
 Cargèse (2A065)
 Casaglione (2A070)
 Cauro (2A085)
 Ciamannacce (2A089)
 Coggia (2A090)
 Cognocoli-Monticchi (2A091)
 Corrano (2A094)
 Coti-Chiavari (2A098)
 Cozzano (2A099)
 Cristinacce (2A100)
 Cuttoli-Corticchiato (2A103)
 Eccica-Suarella (2A104)
 Évisa (2A108)
 Forciolo (2A117)
 Frasseto (2A119)
 Grosseto-Prugna (2A130)
 Guagno (2A131)
 Guargualé (2A132)
 Guitera-les-Bains (2A133)
 Letia (2A141)
 Lopigna (2A144)
 Marignana (2A154)
 Murzo (2A174)
 Ocana (2A181)
 Olivese (2A186)
 Orto (2A196)
 Osani (2A197)
 Ota (2A198)
 Palneca (2A200)
 Partinello (2A203)
 Pastricciola (2A204)
 Peri (2A209)
 Piana (2A212)
 Pietrosella (2A228)
 Pila-Canale (2A232)
 Poggiolo (2A240)
 Quasquara (2A253)
 Renno (2A258)
 Rezza (2A259)
 Rosazia (2A262)
 Salice (2A266)
 Sampolo (2A268)
 Santa-Maria-Siché (2A312)
 Sant'Andréa-d'Orcino (2A295)
 Sari-d'Orcino (2A270)
 Sarrola-Carcopino (2A271)
 Serra-di-Ferro (2A276)
 Serriera (2A279)
 Soccia (2A282)
 Tasso (2A322)
 Tavaco (2A323)
 Tavera (2A324)
 Tolla (2A326)
 Ucciani (2A330)
 Urbalacone (2A331)
 Valle-di-Mezzana (2A336)
 Vero (2A345)
 Vico (2A348)
 Villanova (2A351)
 Zévaco (2A358)
 Zicavo (2A359)
 Zigliara (2A360)

History

The arrondissement of Ajaccio was created as part of the department Liamone in 1800. Between 1811 and 1976 it was an arrondissement of the department Corse, since 1976 it has been an arrondissement of the department Corse-du-Sud. In March 2017 it gained the commune Olivese from the arrondissement of Sartène.

As a result of the reorganisation of the cantons of France which came into effect in 2015, the borders of the cantons are no longer related to the borders of the arrondissements. The cantons of the arrondissement of Ajaccio were, as of January 2015:

 Ajaccio-1
 Ajaccio-2
 Ajaccio-3
 Ajaccio-4
 Ajaccio-5
 Ajaccio-6
 Ajaccio-7
 Bastelica
 Celavo-Mezzana
 Cruzini-Cinarca
 Les Deux-Sevi
 Les Deux-Sorru
 Santa-Maria-Siché
 Zicavo

References

Ajaccio